Bazylevych or Bazylewicz (Cyrillic: Базилевич) is a gender-neutral Slavic surname that may refer to
Oleh Bazylevych (1938–2018), Ukrainian football player and coach 
Vyacheslav Bazylevych (born 1990), Ukrainian-born Russian football goalkeeper 

Ukrainian-language surnames
Polish-language surnames